Mexotis is a genus of flowering plants belonging to the family Rubiaceae.

Its native range is Southern Mexico to Guatemala.

Species:

Mexotis kingii 
Mexotis latifolia 
Mexotis lorencei 
Mexotis terrellii

References

Rubiaceae
Rubiaceae genera